Einar Wilhelms (2 August 1895 – 3 August 1978) was a Norwegian football player. He was born in Fredrikstad, and played as an inside forward for Fredrikstad FK. He was capped 13 times for Norwegian national team scoring five goals, and played at the Antwerp Olympics in 1920, where the Norwegian team reached the quarter finals. He died in Fredrikstad in 1978.

References

1895 births
1978 deaths
Sportspeople from Fredrikstad
Norwegian footballers
Norway international footballers
Footballers at the 1920 Summer Olympics
Olympic footballers of Norway
Association football forwards